State Road 261 (NM 261) is a  state highway in the US state of New Mexico. NM 261's southern terminus is at NM 253 southeast of Roswell, and the northern terminus is at NM 254 southeast of Roswell.

Major intersections

See also

References

261
Transportation in Chaves County, New Mexico